McMackin is a surname of Gaelic origin. Notable people with the surname include:

Greg McMackin (born 1945), American football player and coach
Harry A. McMackin (1880–1946), Canadian politician
Sam McMackin (1872–1903), American baseball player

See also
McMakin